Eagleville is an unincorporated community in Yuba County, California. The community is in a rural area near the intersection of Yuba, Butte, and Plumas County lines. There is no post office. As of 2013, 73,340 people lived in the area.

History
Eagleville was settled about 1851 and named for the nearby Eagle Mine.

Government

References

Unincorporated communities in California
Populated places established in 1851
Unincorporated communities in Yuba County, California
1851 establishments in California